"Escalator of Life" is a song from Robert Hazard's self-titled debut album released in 1982. The song spent 9 weeks on the Billboard Hot 100, peaking at #58 on April 9, 1983. The song is mentioned in the books Preaching the Incarnation and Cyndi Lauper: A Memoir. The single version of the song was remixed and edited by Neil Kernon.

Track listing 

 "Escalator of Life" – 3:30
 "Say Yo" – 4:53

References

RCA Records singles
1982 singles
1982 songs
Robert Hazard songs
Songs about consumerism
Songs written by Robert Hazard